Hakob Hakobian (often transliterated from Russian as Akop Akopian; 29 May 1866, in Elisavetpol – 13 November 1937, in Tbilisi), was a Soviet Armenian poet, the founder of Armenian proletarian poetry. Communist party member from 1904. Awarded with the titles People's Poet of Armenia and People's Poet of Georgia. He was considered as the "Armenian Maksim Gorky" by the Bolshevik press.

Hakobian published his first book in 1899. He's the author of revolutionary poems that include One more cut (1905), Revolution (1905), Died but didn't disappear (1906), Red waves (1911), Shir-Kanal (1924) etc. Hakobian was appointed as the Bank's commissar of Soviet Georgia, he was a member of the government of Transcaucasian Federation.

Books 
 Луначарский А. В., А. Акопян, в его кн.: Статьи о советской литературе, М. (in Russian), 1958;
 Саркисян Г., А. Акопян, Ер., 1956.

References 

1866 births
1937 deaths
Writers from Ganja, Azerbaijan
20th-century Armenian poets
Russian people of Armenian descent
Burials at Armenian Pantheon of Tbilisi
Armenian male poets
20th-century male writers